Fort Rixon is a village and farming centre in Matabeleland in the Republic of Zimbabwe, located some  north-east of Bulawayo. It was founded as a military outpost in 1896 during the rebellion of the Matabele  against British colonial rule of Rhodesia.

Populated places in Zimbabwe